Bernadette Martin (born 13 September 1951 at Grenoble) is a former French athlete, who specialised in the 400 metres and 800 metres.

She won the silver medal in the 4 × 400 metres relay during the 1969 European Athletics Championships alongside Éliane Jacq, Nicole Duclos and Colette Besson.  The French team went faster than the world record in the discipline in 3:30.8, but placed second and was tipped, in a photo finish, for first by the United Kingdom, who ran the same time. She participated in 1972 Summer Olympics, at Munich, and took fourth in the final of the 4 × 400 m (3:27.5 min: a new French record).

Her personal bests were 53.3 seconds in the 400 m (1971), and 2:02.49 minutes in the 800 m (1982).

International competitions

References

 Docathlé 2003, s. 176, 215, 412.  French Athletics Federation 2003.

Living people
1951 births
French female sprinters
French female middle-distance runners
Olympic athletes of France
Athletes (track and field) at the 1972 Summer Olympics
European Athletics Championships medalists
Olympic female sprinters
20th-century French women